Puente de cristal is a Mexican telenovela produced by Ernesto Alonso for Telesistema Mexicano in 1965.

Cast 
 Guillermo Aguilar
 Anita Blanch
 Tony Carbajal
 Miguel Manzano
 Gloria Marín
 Andrea Palma
 Beatriz Sheridan

References

External links 

Mexican telenovelas
1965 telenovelas
Televisa telenovelas
Spanish-language telenovelas
1965 Mexican television series debuts
1965 Mexican television series endings